Clarenville Airport  is  north of Clarenville, Newfoundland and Labrador, Canada.

References

External links
Page about this airport on COPA's Places to Fly airport directory

Registered aerodromes in Newfoundland and Labrador